Boulemane Province is a province of Morocco, formerly in the Fès-Boulemane  Region. The Fès-Boulemane region became part of Fès-Meknès September 2015 by merging Fès-Boulemane with the prefecture of Meknès and the provinces of El Hajeb and Ifrane (in Meknès-Tafilalet region) and the provinces of Taounate and Taza (in Taza-Al Hoceima-Taounate region).

The province had a population of 185,110 people in 2004. 

The major cities and towns are: 
 Boulemane
 Guigou
 Imouzzer Marmoucha
 Missour
 Outat El Haj

Subdivisions
The province is divided administratively into the following:

Infrastructure
In 2019, the Moroccan government and German development bank KFW announced that Boulemane will be one of seven regions to construct a solar energy plant as part of the country's larger goal to increase renewable energy production.

References

 
Boulemane Province